André Filipe Alves Martins Caio (born 23 February 1994 in Castelo Branco) is a Portuguese professional footballer who plays for Sport Benfica e Castelo Branco as a goalkeeper.

References

External links

1994 births
Living people
People from Castelo Branco, Portugal
Sportspeople from Castelo Branco District
Portuguese footballers
Association football goalkeepers
Liga Portugal 2 players
Campeonato de Portugal (league) players
Padroense F.C. players
FC Porto B players
C.D. Mafra players
Sport Benfica e Castelo Branco players